Herbert Joseph Spinden (1879–1967) was an American anthropologist, archeologist and art historian who specialized in the study of Native American cultures of the US and Mesoamerica.

Biography
Spinden was born in 1879 in Huron, a small settlement in the Dakota Territory. He later recalled that his early childhood was spent on the edge of civilization where his family lived in a sod hut with oiled paper covering the windows. Later they moved to Tacoma, Washington where he attended public schools. Before starting college he worked on railroad surveys in the Northwest and in 1900, a gold rush drew him to Nome, Alaska.

Spinden started Harvard University in 1902 and studied anthropology and archeology. In the summer of 1905 he and a fellow student excavated a Mandan village in North Dakota and studied the language and culture of that tribe. They published a paper on the topic in 1906, Spinden's first publication. After receiving an A.B. degree in 1906, he continued his studies at Harvard where he specialized in Maya art under the direction of Alfred Tozzer. He received a doctorate degree in 1909 after submitting his thesis, A Study of Mayan Art, which has been called a "brilliant analysis of the evolution of styles". 

He then worked American Museum of Natural History where he undertook archeological studies in Mexico and Central America. While working as an archeologist in Central America he and Sylvanus G. Morley were among the American scientists gathering intelligence for the US Army. 

He then curated the collection of the Peabody Museum at Harvard, before taking museum positions in Brooklyn and Buffalo. He also did ethnographic studies among the Nez Percé. In 1919 he published a study of Maya calendrics giving a correlation between the Maya calendar and the Gregorian calendar – a correlation which was nonetheless not widely accepted.

Spinden's first wife was archaeologist Ellen S. Spinden; they separated in 1938 and eventually divorced. In 1948, Spinden married dancer Ailes Gilmour. They had a son, Joseph.

Works
The Ancient Civilisations of Mexico and Central America, Handbook no. 3 (New York: American Museum of Natural History, 1922)

Notes

References

American archaeologists
American Mesoamericanists
Mayanists
Mesoamerican archaeologists
Mesoamerican epigraphers
1879 births
1967 deaths
People of the Office of Naval Intelligence
World War I spies for the United States
Harvard University alumni
20th-century Mesoamericanists
People from Huron, South Dakota